Montserrat is a 1902 Spanish short black-and-white silent documentary film directed by Segundo de Chomón.

See also 
 List of Spanish films before 1930

External links 
 

1902 films
Spanish black-and-white films
Films directed by Segundo de Chomón
Spanish silent short films
Spanish short documentary films
1900s short documentary films